John Alick (born 25 April 1991) is a Ni-Vanuatu footballer who plays as a midfielder for the Solomon Warriors in the Solomon Islands S-League and the Vanuatu national football team.

Club career
Alick was born on the island of Espiritu Santo, the largest island in Vanuatu. When he was 20 years old, he joined the new found club Malampa Revivors. With the club he reached in 2015 the final of the 2015 VFF National Super League after winning in the semi-final against Ifira Black Bird. In the final they lost by 3 goals to nil against Amicale. However, for the 2017 OFC Champions League the OFC decided that Vanuatu got two spots instead of one. So in March 2017 Malampa Revivors was the first non-Port Vila club to play in the OFC Champions League. Alick was part of the team, however it was not his first Champions League experience, because in 2016 he joined PNG outfit Hekari United to play with them in the 2016 OFC Champions League. After the 2017 Champions League Alick joined the Solomon Warriors in the summer. With the club he won the 2017, 2018 and 2019–20 Solomon Islands S-League. Alick won the 2019-20 Telekom S-League Player of the Season Award in February 2020.

National team
For a long time Alick was not a part of the Vanuatu national football team. However, in 2017 he got a call up for a friendly game in and against the Solomon Islands. Alick played the full 90 minutes on that 28 July 2017 in a game that ended in a 0 all draw. In November he was called up for the game against Estonia and for the 2017 Pacific Mini Games.

References

External links
 

Living people
1991 births
Vanuatuan expatriate footballers
Expatriate footballers in Papua New Guinea
Expatriate footballers in the Solomon Islands
Association football midfielders
Vanuatu international footballers
Vanuatuan footballers
Erakor Golden Star F.C. players
Vanuatuan expatriate sportspeople in Papua New Guinea
Vanuatuan expatriate sportspeople in the Solomon Islands